Banatski Brestovac is a village located in the Municipality of Pančevo, in the South Banat District of Serbia. It is situated in the Autonomous Province of Vojvodina. The village has a Serbian ethnic majority and its population numbers 3,251 people (2011 census).

Name

The name of the village refers to the stands of elm trees which surrounded the village. The name of the village is of Serbian origin, and a legend about origin of the name claims that the village was first settled by Rascian people from the village of Brestovik located on the southern bank of the Danube.

In Serbian, the village is known as Banatski Brestovac, in Hungarian as Beresztóc (official name from 1898 to 1918) and in German as Brestowatz (official name Rustendorf from March 1943 to September 1944).

Geography
Since 1995, there is a protected nature park Ponjavica south of the village.

There is a camp and a village called Jabukov Cvet (serbian for apple flower, because of apple plantation located there) near Banatski Brestovac. Jabukov Cvet is known tourist destination of that area. The camp is visited by many international tourists during the year.

History 

The official year of founding of Brestovac is 1717, but it is only documented an abandoned settlement with 12 uninhabited houses in that time. The communal area was a part of Temeşvar Eyalet in Ottoman Empire since 1552, after the Treaty of Požarevac a part of Habsburg's Banat, since 1765 of the military frontier (Austrian Empire) and then it belonged to the Torontál county of Austria-Hungary. After World War I was that area a part of provisional Torontalsko-tamiške županja (Treaty of Trianon), in 1922 of Belgrade oblast and since 1929 of the Danube Banovina in the Kingdom of Yugoslavia. In the time after World War II its belonged to the Srez Pančevo of the Socialist Federal Republic of Yugoslavia and the Federal Republic of Yugoslavia. The communal area of Banatski Brestovac was a part of the administrative region of the Pančevo municipality from all these centuries to the present.

There is an impression of the old village which is recorded on the map of the Franciscan land survey from the early 19th century at the National Archives of Austria. In 1902, cadastral maps of the village were recorded which are located at the National Archives of Hungary.

Historical population

Economy
The main occupation of the people is in agriculture, as with many other local settlements. Since several years, there is an annual event named Paprikijada in the village, organized by an economic and cultural association of local women called Aktiv Žena Sosa. During the event, all kinds of paprika are sold, culinary tastings of dishes offered, and the biggest and most beautiful paprika is chosen.

Gallery

See also
List of places in Serbia
List of cities, towns and villages in Vojvodina

References

External links
 Banatski Brestovac on the Official Website by the Municipality of Pančevo 

Pančevo
Populated places in Serbian Banat
Populated places in South Banat District